Emperor Maciste (Italian: Maciste imperatore) is a 1924 Italian silent adventure film directed by Guido Brignone and starring Bartolomeo Pagano, Domenico Gambino and Franz Sala. It was part of the peplum series of silent films featuring the strongman Maciste. The character of Maciste increasingly came to resemble Benito Mussolini, in this case striking Fascistic poses and defending order against criminal and dishonest elements.

Cast 
 Bartolomeo Pagano as Maciste 
 Domenico Gambino as Saetta
 Franz Sala 
 Elena Sangro
 Oreste Grandi
 Augusto Bandini 
 Lola Romanos 
 Gero Zambuto 
 Felice Minotti
 Armand Pouget
 Lorenzo Soderini

References

Bibliography 
 Gundle, Stephen. Mussolini's Dream Factory: Film Stardom in Fascist Italy. Berghahn Books, 2013. 
 Moliterno, Gino. Historical Dictionary of Italian Cinema. Scarecrow Press, 2008.
 Ricci, Steven. Cinema and Fascism: Italian Film and Society, 1922–1943. University of California Press, 2008.

External links 
 

1924 films
Italian adventure films
Italian silent feature films
1920s Italian-language films
Films directed by Guido Brignone
1924 adventure films
Films set in Europe
Maciste films
Italian black-and-white films
Silent adventure films
1920s Italian films